Iron Dragon may refer to:

Iron Dragon (roller coaster), a suspended roller coaster at Cedar Point in Sandusky, Ohio
Iron Dragon (board game), a Crayon rails board game made by Mayfair Games
A monster in the MMORPG RuneScape.
A competitive dragonboat team at the University of Toronto, Faculty of Applied Science and Engineering.